Nicholas David Ionel (born 12 October 2002) is a Romanian tennis player. He has a career high ATP singles ranking of No. 227 achieved on 28 November 2022. He also has a career high ATP doubles ranking of No. 448 achieved on 28 November 2022. He is currently the No. 1 Romanian player.

Career

2020: ATP qualification debut
Ionel won the 2020 Australian Open – Boys' doubles title.

Ionel was awarded with a qualification wildcard to play his first ATP tournament at the 2020 European Open, where he pushed former world No. 36 Yūichi Sugita to three sets.

2022: Top 250 debut
He reached the top 250 in singles on 7 November 2022 at No. 241.

Personal life
He trains at the Mouratoglou Academy in Sophia Antipolis since 2018.

Junior Grand Slam titles

Doubles: 1 (1 title)

ITF World Tennis Tour and ATP Challenger finals

Singles: 15 (10-5)

Doubles: 3 (1–2)

References

External links
 
 

2002 births
Living people
Romanian male tennis players
Tennis players from Bucharest
Australian Open (tennis) junior champions
Grand Slam (tennis) champions in boys' doubles